Kaminaria is a village in the Limassol District of Cyprus, located 2 km south of Treis Elies.

References

Communities in Limassol District